Frauke Finsterwalder (born 15 December 1975) is a German film director and screenwriter. Finsterwalder has directed several shorts and documentaries and is the director of the 2013 feature film Finsterworld. Her second feature film, Sisi & I, will be released in 2023.

Early life 
Finsterwalder spent part of her early life in the United States before studying literature and history at Humboldt University in Berlin.

Career
Before beginning her career as a director, Finsterwalder worked as an assistant director at Berlin’s Volksbühne theatre and the Maxim Gorki Theatre. In addition to this, she worked as an editor for the German newspaper Süddeutsche Zeitung before returning to study documentary film direction at the Hochschule für Fernsehen und Film München in Munich. In 2005 Finsterwalder directed her first short film, 0.003 km.

Finsterwalder cites films by directors Wes Anderson, Terrence Malick and Paul Verhoeven amongst influences for her debut feature film. She frequently casts Sandra Hüller in her films and frequently works with editor Andreas Menn.

Documentary films

Weil der Mensch ein Mensch ist
After directing her first short, Finsterwalder worked with Stephan Hilpert to direct Weil der Mensch ein Mensch ist ('Because a man is human'). This film, whose title is derived from the lyrics of the United Front Song (Das Einheitsfrontlied) by Bertolt Brecht and Hanns Eisler, deals with the inculcation of democracy in young people. It received very positive press upon its release in 2007.

Die große Pyramide
In 2010, Finsterwalder directed her second documentary film, Die große Pyramide ('The Great Pyramid'). This documentary follows the plans of a group of young men, including German writer Ingo Niermann, who set out to build the largest man-made structure in history: a gigantic Great Pyramid Monument that would be built in fields in eastern Germany and would serve as both a tourist attraction and as the final resting place of over a billion people.

Finsterworld 
Finsterwalder’s first feature-length film Finsterworld, which was co-written by the Swiss writer Christian Kracht, was premiered at the Munich Film Festival in July 2013.  The film follows the interwoven stories of twelve central characters played, amongst others, by Sandra Hüller, Jakub Gierszał, Ronald Zehrfeld, Margit Carstensen, Carla Juri, Michael Maertens and Corinna Harfouch.

Reception and acclaim 
Finsterworld has been shown in many countries across the world to critical acclaim. It received the Zenith Award for best debut picture at the Montréal World Film Festival and also received the award for Best Feature Film at the Cologne Conference. At the 2013 Zurich Film Festival, Finsterwalder received a Golden Eye award for Best German Language Film as well as the Swiss Film Critics’ Award. The film also received the award for Best Picture at the 2014 Vancouver International Women In Film Festival., as well as winning best female-directed narrative at the 2014 Edinburgh International Film Festival. The film received nominations in five categories for the 2014 Deutscher Filmpreis German Academy awards: Best Picture, Best Screenplay, Best Supporting Actress, Best Supporting Actor and Best Musical Score. Sandra Hüller received the Lola award for Best Supporting Actress for her role in the film.

Sisi & I 
Finsterwalder's next feature film, Sisi & I, is a retelling of the later years of Empress Elisabeth of Austria from the point of view of her lady-in-waiting, Irma Sztáray. The cast includes Sandra Hüller, who starred in Finsterwalder's previous film, Finsterworld, as well as Susanne Wolff, Tom Rhys Harries, Stefan Kurt, Georg Friedrich, Angela Winkler and Johanna Wokalek. The film will premiere at the 73rd Berlin Film Festival on 19 February 2023, and it is scheduled to be released in Germany on 30 March 2023.

Personal life
Finsterwalder is married to the Swiss writer Christian Kracht. They live in Zurich.

Filmography

Feature films
 2013: Finsterworld
 2023: Sisi & I

References

External links
 

1975 births
Living people
Film people from Hamburg
German women film directors